was a Japanese cross-country skier. He competed in the men's 18 kilometre event at the 1928 Winter Olympics.

References

1902 births
1992 deaths
Japanese male cross-country skiers
Olympic cross-country skiers of Japan
Cross-country skiers at the 1928 Winter Olympics
Sportspeople from Hokkaido
20th-century Japanese people